Pio Quinto is a Nicaraguan dessert consisting of cake drenched in rum, topped with a custard, and dusted with cinnamon.  Some recipes also include rum soaked prunes or raisins.  Pio Quinto is eaten after meals or during Christmas time. The cake is believed to have been named after Pope Pius V, but the connection is unknown.

References

Custard desserts
Nicaraguan cuisine
Cakes
Foods with alcoholic drinks
Christmas cakes